The 2022–23 American Eagles men's basketball team represented American University in the 2022–23 NCAA Division I men's basketball season. The Eagles, led by 10th-year head coach Mike Brennan, played their home games at Bender Arena in Washington, D.C. as members of the Patriot League. They finished the season 17–15, 7–11 in Patriot League play to finish in a four-way tie for sixth place. As the No. 7 seed in the Patriot League tournament, they defeated Bucknell and Navy before losing to Lafayette in the semifinals.

Previous season
The Eagles finished the 2021–22 season 10–22, 5–13 in Patriot League play to finish in a tie for last place. As the No. 10 seed in the Patriot League tournament, they defeated Holy Cross in the first round, before losing to Navy in the quarterfinals.

Roster

Schedule and results

|-
!colspan=12 style=| Non-conference regular season

|-
!colspan=12 style=| Patriot League regular season

|-
!colspan=9 style=| Patriot League tournament

|-

Sources

References

American Eagles men's basketball seasons
American Eagles
American Eagles men's basketball
American Eagles men's basketball